Andrew Cameron Sutton (born March 10, 1975) is a Canadian former professional ice hockey defenceman. He has previously played in the National Hockey League (NHL) with the Edmonton Oilers, San Jose Sharks, Minnesota Wild, Atlanta Thrashers, New York Islanders, Ottawa Senators and Anaheim Ducks in a 14-year career.

Playing career

Minor/Collegiate
Sutton was born in London, Ontario, and played most of his youth hockey with the Greater London Hockey Association and the rep London Sabres AAA program.

At the age of 14, Sutton moved with his family to Kingston, Ontario. He played Junior "B" hockey in Gananoque, Ontario, at age 16, later playing in the Metro Toronto Junior Hockey League for St. Mike's B's. His play with St. Mike's earned him a scholarship to play collegiate hockey for Michigan Technological University in the Western Collegiate Hockey Association (WCHA). Sutton played four seasons with Michigan Tech, where he switched from left wing to defence.

Professional
Six weeks before he was to finish his degree in environmental engineering, Sutton was signed as a free agent by the NHL's San Jose Sharks on March 20, 1998. He made his NHL debut with the Sharks in the 1998–99 season and played in 71 games in his two seasons with San Jose before being selected by the Minnesota Wild in the 2000 NHL Expansion Draft.

Sutton played parts of two seasons with the Wild before being traded to the Atlanta Thrashers in exchange for forward Hnat Domenichelli on January 22, 2002. Sutton spent over four-and-a-half years with the Thrashers, appearing in 273 games and establishing himself as one of the NHL's most physically-imposing defenders. In 2005–06, Sutton registered a career-high eight goals and 25 points.

Sutton became an unrestricted free agent after the 2006–07 season and signed a three-year contract with the New York Islanders on August 10, 2007. In the 2008–09 season, his second with the Islanders, Sutton played in only 23 games before a broken foot sidelined him for the remainder of the season.

Sutton returned for the 2009–10 season, scoring four goals in 54 games with the Islanders before being traded to the Ottawa Senators at the NHL trade deadline in exchange for a second-round pick in the 2010 NHL Entry Draft. TV commentator Don Cherry called it the "biggest" trade of the year in reference to Sutton's size and the potential impact his physical play could make for the Senators in the post-season. Indeed, in Ottawa's first round playoff series Sutton delivered a devastating and much publicized hip-check to Pittsburgh Penguins' defenceman Jordan Leopold, described as one of the most devastating hits in recent memory.

On August 2, 2010, Sutton signed as a free agent to a two-year, $4.25 million contract with the Anaheim Ducks. After only one season in Anaheim, Sutton was traded to the Edmonton Oilers in exchange for Kurtis Foster on July 1, 2011 .

While with the Oilers, Sutton delivered an illegal check to the head on Colorado Avalanche forward Gabriel Landeskog on October 28, 2011. Though Landeskog was uninjured, the illegality of the hit resulted in a five-game suspension for Sutton. Just a few weeks later, on December 8, 2011, Sutton was suspended indefinitely pending a hearing as a result of a hit delivered to Carolina Hurricanes' forward Alexei Ponikarovsky. He ended up receiving an eight-game suspension. Sutton finished the season with three goals and ten points in 52 games.

On May 22, 2013, Sutton officially announced his retirement from professional hockey.

Career statistics

Regular season and playoffs

Awards and honours

Transactions
 March 20, 1998 - Signed as a free agent by San Jose Sharks.
 June 12, 2000 - Traded to Minnesota by San Jose with San Jose's seventh-round choice (Peter Bartos) in 2000 NHL Entry Draft and San Jose's third-round choice in 2001 NHL Entry Draft for Minnesota's eighth-round choice in the 2001 Draft and future considerations.
 January 22, 2002 - Traded to Atlanta Thrashers by Minnesota for Hnat Domenichelli.
 September 24, 2004 - Signed as a free agent by GCK Zurich (Swiss-2).
 February 22, 2005 - Loaned to ZSC Zurich (Swiss) by GCK Zurich (Swiss-2).
 August 10, 2007 - Signed as a free agent by New York Islanders.
 March 2, 2010 - Traded to Ottawa Senators by Islanders for a second-round choice in 2010 NHL Entry Draft.
 August 2, 2010 - Signed as a free agent by Anaheim Ducks.
 July 1, 2011 - Traded to Edmonton Oilers by Anaheim Ducks for Kurtis Foster.

References

External links 

1975 births
Living people
Anaheim Ducks players
Atlanta Thrashers players
Canadian ice hockey defencemen
Canadian people of English descent
Edmonton Oilers players
GCK Lions players
Kentucky Thoroughblades players
Sportspeople from London, Ontario
Michigan Tech Huskies men's ice hockey players
Minnesota Wild players
New York Islanders players
Ottawa Senators players
San Jose Sharks players
Ice hockey people from Ontario
Undrafted National Hockey League players
ZSC Lions players